Excélsior F.C., full name Excélsior Futbol Club, was a professional soccer team that played in Santa Ana, El Salvador.

Excélsior competed in the national sports week soccer tournament that the Salvadoran Sports Commission held at that time.

History
In 1928, Excélsior  made its first appearance to the final, playing Hércules in Campo Marte. In the first match, they tied 1–1. A second match was played to determine a winner. In the replay match, they were defeated by Hércules, final score of 2–0.

The following year, they matched up again with two-time champion Hércules. In the first match, at the Finca Modelo, they beat Hércules 2–0. In the second leg, played at Campo Marte, Hércules edged out in a 3–1 win over. Excélsior withdrew from the third and deciding match due to complains about the officiating and extreme brutality from Hércules players. The Salvadoran Sports Commission ignored their appeal, so Excélsior forfeited as Hércules won their third straight national title.

Honours
Excélsior's first trophy was the TBD, which they won  in TBD. They won 1  Segunda División title in TBD.

Excélsior's honours include the following:

Domestic honours

Leagues
Primera División de Fútbol de El Salvador
 Runners up (2): 1928, 1929
 Segunda División Salvadorean and predecessors 
 Champions: (1): Liga de Ascenso 1970

List of notable players
Players with senior international caps
  Raúl Magaña

References

Defunct football clubs in El Salvador
Santa Ana, El Salvador